Benjamin Cope (Ben) Thompson (11 April 1924 – 23 March 1998) was a Canadian lawyer and politician. Thompson served as a Progressive Conservative party member of the House of Commons of Canada.

He was first elected at the Northumberland riding in the 1957 general election and re-elected there in the 1958 election. Thompson left federal politics after completing his second term, the 24th Canadian Parliament, and did not campaign in the 1962 election. He died of cancer on 23 March 1998.

References

External links
 

1924 births
1998 deaths
Members of the House of Commons of Canada from Ontario
Lawyers in Ontario
Politicians from Toronto
Progressive Conservative Party of Canada MPs
20th-century Canadian lawyers
Deaths from cancer in Ontario